This is a list of listed buildings in Esbjerg Municipality, Denmark.

The list

6700 Esbjerg

6710 Esbjerg

6740 Bramming

6760 Ribe
This list is incomplete

References

External links

 Danish Agency of Culture

 
Furesø